Statistics of JSL Cup in the 1982 season.

Overview
It was contested by 20 teams, and Furukawa Electric won the championship.

Results

1st round
Furukawa Electric 3-1 Yomiuri
Teijin 2-1 Saitama Teachers
Hitachi 0-1 Nippon Steel
Fujita Industries 10-0 Kofu

2nd round
Mitsubishi Motors 4-1 Toyota Motors
Furukawa Electric 6-1 Nissan Motors
Sumitomo Metals 1-1 (PK 4–1) Teijin
Nippon Kokan 1-1 (PK 5–4) Fujitsu
Yamaha Motors 1-0 Tanabe Pharmaceuticals
Nippon Steel 1-1 (PK 3–4) Toshiba
Yanmar Diesel 1-1 (PK 7–6) Fujita Industries
Mazda 1-3 Honda

Quarterfinals
Mitsubishi Motors 3-4 Furukawa Electric
Sumitomo Metals 0-6 Nippon Kokan
Yamaha Motors 1-0 Toshiba
Yanmar Diesel 3-0 Honda

Semifinals
Furukawa Electric 1-1 (PK 4–3) Nippon Kokan
Yamaha Motors 0-0 (PK 2–4) Yanmar Diesel

Final
Furukawa Electric 3-2 Yanmar Diesel
Furukawa Electric won the championship

References
 

JSL Cup
League Cup